Mecklenburg Switzerland is a landscape in the middle of the German state of Mecklenburg-Vorpommern, north of the Mecklenburg Lake District and immediately northwest of Lake Malchin and Lake Kummerow. The region lies northwest of the line from Lake Malchin via the Dahmen Canal and Lake Kummerow to the Peene(canal) near Neukalen and from there southeast of the line from Lelkendorf via Lake Teterow, Teterow and Groß Wokern to the Malchin Basin. However, there is no precise definition of its boundaries. The majority of the landscape lies within the Mecklenburg Switzerland and Lake Kummerow Nature Park. Its attraction include its unspoilt nature, the hills, its villages that have preserved their original character and its castles. Some 19% of Mecklenburg Switzerland is woodland and 10% is water.

Towns and villages
The towns and villages of this landscape are:

Image gallery

See also 
 Regions whose name incorporates "Switzerland"

Literature 

Jens Klocksin: Reiseführer Mecklenburgische Schweiz. Land und Leute zwischen Müritz und Demmin, Güstrow und Neubrandenburg. Bäßler, Berlin 1998. 
Rund um die Mecklenburgische Schweiz. Karte M 1:60.000; Ampel-Verlag, Berlin

External links 

Mecklenburg Switzerland
Mecklenburg Switzerland Nature Park
Avenues of Mecklenburg Switzerland

Rostock (district)
Regions of Mecklenburg-Western Pomerania
Mecklenburgische Seenplatte (district)